"Paint It Black" (stylized as "PAiNT it BLACK") is a song by the Japanese girl idol group Bish, released as its third major-label single on 28 March 2018.

The song was used as the second opening theme for the anime series Black Clover. (Starting from the 14th episode, broadcast on TV Tokyo and BS Japan on 8 January 2018.)

Released as a single on the label Avex Trax on 28 March 2018, this song debuted at number one on the Oricon CD Single Chart.

References

External links 
 Black Clover opening 2 – "Paint It Black" on YouTube

2018 songs
2018 singles
Avex Trax singles
Anime songs
Oricon Weekly number-one singles